The Polaski King House was a Federal style house located at 2270 Valley Drive in Syracuse, New York.  It was built around 1810 of brick laid in a Flemish bond pattern on a limestone foundation.  Polaski King was an early settler of what was then Onondaga Hollow.  He founded the first school in the settlement and was involved in local government.  The house is no longer standing.

References

Houses on the National Register of Historic Places in New York (state)
Federal architecture in New York (state)
Houses in Syracuse, New York
National Register of Historic Places in Syracuse, New York